Renate Blume (born 3 May 1944) is a German actress. She has appeared in more than 70 films and television shows since 1964. She was a member of the jury at the 14th Moscow International Film Festival.

From 1969 until 1975 she was married to film director Frank Beyer. Their son, Alexander, also became an actor. In 1981 she married Dean Reed, an American actor, singer and songwriter living in East Germany.

Selected filmography
 Divided Heaven (1964)
 Frozen Flashes (1967)
 Ulzana (1974)
 Archiv des Todes (1980)

References

External links

1944 births
Living people
German film actresses
20th-century German actresses
21st-century German actresses
People from Bad Wildungen
East German actors
East German women